Purrkur Pillnikk ('Sleepy Chess-Player') was a rock band from late punk era in Iceland. The band existed for 18 months (1981–1982) and were very active as they released at least two LPs, one live-album and two EPs. The distinguishable character of the band were Einar Örn's howling and off-key singing and his lyrics that most often described very day-to-day things but with a lot of interwoven angst. Members of the band later found themselves in Kukl, or in 1986 in the Sugarcubes.

Members
The members were: Ásgeir R. Bragason, Bragi Ólafsson, Einar Örn Benediktsson and Friðrik Erlingsson. The three latter ones formed Smekkleysa/Bad Taste publishing house in Reykjavík with friends and were also members of the Sugarcubes.

Recordings
Their records were: Tilf, a 7-inch EP containing 10 songs and lasting about 12 minutes in total; Ekki enn, an LP containing 17 songs; Googooplex, a double 45RPM album containing 13 songs; No Time to Think, a 7-inch EP containing 4 songs; and the posthumous live LP Maskínan, containing 17 songs including several not on the other records, most notably a 5-song suite entitled "Orð fyrir dauða" (Words before death) specifically written for their swansong concert at the Melarokk festival in August 1982. They also had a track on the ROIR Records compilation World Class Punk.

Tour
The band toured Britain with the Fall in 1982. Some of those dates are listed below:

 Monday 3 May - Band on the Wall
 Tuesday 4 May - Band on the Wall
 Wednesday 5 May - Band on the Wall

Recently, popular Icelandic dance outfit GusGus released a song entitled "If you don't jump" which samples Purrkur Pillnikk's signature song, "Augum úti".

References

External links

Icelandic punk rock groups
Musical groups from Reykjavík